Suka Sukani (Aymara suka furrow, the reduplication indicates that there is a complex of something, "the one with the furrows", also spelled Suca Sucani) is a mountain in the Bolivian Andes which reaches a height of approximately . It is located in the La Paz Department, Loayza Province, Sapahaqui Municipality (Sapa Jaqhi). Suka Sukani lies northeast of Q'ara Qullu and K'ark'ani.

References 

Mountains of La Paz Department (Bolivia)